The 2013–14 New Orleans Privateers women's basketball team represented the University of New Orleans during the 2013–14 NCAA Division I women's basketball season. The Privateers were led by third year head coach Keeshawn Davenport and played their home games at Lakefront Arena. The 2013–14 season was the Privateers' initial season as a member of the Southland Conference.

Roster

Schedule
Source

|-
!colspan=9| Regular Season

See also
 2013–14 New Orleans Privateers men's basketball team

References

New Orleans Privateers women's basketball seasons
New Orleans
New
New